Dipti Mehta is an Indian American actress best known for her portrayal of Reina in Life! Camera Action... bringing her multiple international awards and nominations.

Early life 
Mehta was born and raised in Mumbai. Mehta dreamed of being an actor since she was very young. She studied at SKI Jain Girls High School in Marine Lines, Mumbai and went to Wilson College and then to Sophia College for her bachelor's and master's degrees. She majored in Microbiology with Biotechnology as her minor. Mehta has earned a Ph.D. in molecular and cellular biology from the University of Arizona. She acted in plays and various theater projects while attending college. She was a part of a semi-classical dance group in Arizona. She got training in Bharatanatyam and Kathak dance forms while getting her doctoral degree.

She has worked as a radio jockey on the FM station of All India Radio hosting music shows in Hindi and English. She has also appeared in Hindi TV shows and Bollywood films.

Acting career 
Mehta started her acting career on stage with Gujarati plays and moved on to becoming a regularly heard voice on All India Radio with the FM section of Mumbai. This launched her into the world of hosting live and recorded events. She then starred in the TV serial Hum Tum on Zee Next as the fashion designer Anjali. She also hosted a yoga show "Arogya Sampada" on Zee International. She auditioned for the Gujarati series of the yoga show then continuing to be a co-host on Hindi show Yoga for You for Zee International. In all she recorded 450 episodes for Zee International. Before starring in Life! Camera Action... Mehta did cameos in a few Bollywood films. In an interview Mehta revealed that In an informal meeting before the audition for Life! Camera Action..., director Rohit Gupta thought she was not right for the part, although she was invited at the audition, where he failed to recognize her at the first tryout. Mehta did get the part, and it became her debut film as a lead.

"Rohit and I met as someone had suggested my name for this role, but in that meeting he told me, I was not right for the part, and maybe in future we would work together on another project. I still got an audition call and I thought it was probably a mistake that I had been called in, but decided to go anyway. Since I had nothing to gain or lose, I went without dressing up like an actor (to impress). I was wearing regular shirt and jeans and no make up at all. Rohit did not recognize me at first and then when I introduced myself he said you look very different today. I auditioned and he offered me the part.

She also appeared as the lead in Penumbra, a short film which was showcased at Short film corner - Cannes film festival in 2012. She played the role of Priya in Yaatra which she also wrote and produced.

Mehta was seen playing Nisha in an off-off-Broadway show, Bollywood Wedding in New York. In addition to acting, Mehta also loves to write. She has written two plays and one screenplay so far. The first play she wrote was Grahan, which won her best script and three other awards at a theatre competition, "Astitva 2004" in Mumbai.
In 2012 Mehta wrote and performed her one-woman show, Honour. She performed 5 different characters in Honour which was produced by "La Mama and Loose Change Productions". She was invited to perform a Bollywood form dance sequence at the World Music & Independent Film Festival's 2011 gala awards ceremony in Washington D.C where she was nominated for the Best Actress award for her performance in Life! Camera Action..... She shared the stage with 2 times Golden Globe and Academy awards nominee Carol Connors (singer).

Philanthropy 
Mehta’s one-woman show HONOUR: Confessions of a Mumbai Courtesan throws light on sex trafficking and her show provided platform for an interactive panel discussion for AF3IRM NY chapter.

Filmography

Television

Awards and nominations

References

External links 

Actress Dipti Mehta at the Premiere in New York

Living people
Actresses from Mumbai
Indian film actresses
Year of birth missing (living people)
Actresses from Ahmedabad